Still Hopes, also known as the Gabriel Alexander Guignard House and South Carolina Episcopal Home, is an historic home located at Cayce, Lexington County, South Carolina. It was built in 1910, and is a two-story, brick, Georgian Revival mansion with a truncated hip roof. The front façade features a two-story, flat roofed portico supported by paired Ionic order columns. It has a one-story, ornamented wraparound porch. In 1977, it was expanded and renovated to convert the mansion for use as an Episcopal retirement home.  It was built as a residence for Gabriel Alexander Guignard (1860-1926), and the red brick for construction was manufactured by Guignard Brick Works.

It was listed on the National Register of Historic Places in 1983.

References

Houses on the National Register of Historic Places in South Carolina
Georgian Revival architecture in South Carolina
Houses completed in 1910
Houses in Lexington County, South Carolina
National Register of Historic Places in Lexington County, South Carolina